Polyphenylsulfone (PPSF or PPSU) is a high performance polymer made of aromatic rings linked by sulfone (SO2) groups.

Production
Commercially important polysulfones are prepared by condensation of 4,4'-bis(chlorophenyl)sulfone with various bisphenols. Two bisphenols for this application are bisphenol A (the polymer being called PSF) and 4,4'-bis(4-hydroxyphenyl)sulfone (the polymer being called PES).

Applications
PPSF is a moldable plastic often used in rapid prototyping and rapid manufacturing (direct digital manufacturing) applications. Polyphenylsulfone is heat and chemical-resistant suited for automotive, aerospace, and plumbing applications. Polyphenylsulfone has no melting point, reflecting its amorphous nature, and offers tensile strength up to 55 MPa (8000 psi). Its commercial name is Radel. In plumbing applications, polyphenylsulfone fittings have been found to sometimes form cracks prematurely or to experience failure when improperly installed using non-manufacturer approved installation methods or systems.

References

Plastics
3D printing
Polymers